Sandeep Kurissery (sometimes credited Sandeep Madhavam) (born 29 March 1982) is an Indian film sound designer, sound editor and location sound recordist. He, along with Jiji P Joseph won the first ever award for location sound recording for the film Oraalppokkam in the 2014 Kerala State Film Awards. The duo won the award again in 2015 with Ozhivudivasathe Kali.  Sandeep has worked with some of the leading filmmakers in South India like Girish Kasaravalli, Shaji N Karun, Vipin Vijay and Shyamaprasad.

Early life
He was born to Mohan Kurissery and Retnakala in Vanchiyoor in Thiruvananthapuram, Kerala. He is the grandson of author and scholar Kurissery Gopala Pillai (paternal) and Ayurvedic physician Dr. R.P Chittezham (maternal).

After completing his schooling in SMV High School, Thiruvananthapuram, Sandeep graduated from Govt. Arts College, Thiruvananthapuram. Realising his passion for audio, he took a diploma in audio engineering from SAE Technology College, Chennai where G V Prakash Kumar was his classmate. He also has a diploma in Journalism and Communication from the University of Kerala.

Career
Sandeep's career as an audio engineer started in Kairali TV in 2003. His recording work in  shows like "Thaaraattu" and "Kottayam Nazeer Show" were particularly noteworthy. Since 2006, he is working with Manorama News.

Interested in music and sounds from an early age, he has been associated with documentaries and short films as musician, sound recordist and sound designer. He has also been involved in "Kaathoram", an initiative to bring out free audiobooks in Malayalam. His work in the short film "Amguleechaalitham" led to director Sanal Kumar Sasidharan inviting him to join the crew of Oraalppokkam.

Personal life
Sandeep is married to Ramya, who is a journalist. They have a son, Madhav.

Filmography

References

External links

Sandeep Kurissery at the Malayalam Movie & Music DataBase
45th Kerala State Film Awards 2014 - Declaration
46th Kerala State Film Awards 2015 - Declaration
Resul Pookutty's congratulatory tweet
ജനകീയ ചലച്ചിത്രവഴിയില്‍ ഒരുക്കിയ ഒരാള്‍പ്പൊക്കം തിയറ്ററുകളിലേക്ക്

Film musicians from Kerala
1982 births
Musicians from Thiruvananthapuram
Indian sound designers
Kerala State Film Award winners
Living people